Ellipsoidal coordinates are a three-dimensional orthogonal coordinate system  that generalizes the two-dimensional elliptic coordinate system.  Unlike most three-dimensional orthogonal coordinate systems that feature quadratic coordinate surfaces, the ellipsoidal coordinate system is based on confocal quadrics.

Basic formulae

The Cartesian coordinates  can be produced from the ellipsoidal coordinates 
 by the equations

where the following limits apply to the coordinates

Consequently, surfaces of constant  are ellipsoids

whereas surfaces of constant  are hyperboloids of one sheet

because the last term in the lhs is negative, and surfaces of constant  are hyperboloids of two sheets

because the last two terms in the lhs are negative.

The orthogonal system of quadrics used for the ellipsoidal coordinates are confocal quadrics.

Scale factors and differential operators

For brevity in the equations below, we introduce a function

where  can represent any of the three variables .  
Using this function, the scale factors can be written

Hence, the infinitesimal volume element equals

and the Laplacian is defined by

Angular parametrization 

An alternative parametrization exists that closely follows the angular parametrization of spherical coordinates:

The corresponding volume element is

See also
 Ellipsoidal latitude
 Focaloid (shell given by two coordinate surfaces)
 Map projection of the triaxial ellipsoid

References

Bibliography

Unusual convention
  Uses (ξ, η, ζ) coordinates that have the units of distance squared.

External links
MathWorld description of confocal ellipsoidal coordinates

Three-dimensional coordinate systems
Orthogonal coordinate systems